Joseph B. Fusco (born February 3, 1938) is a former American football player, coach, and college athletics administrator.  He served as the head coach at Westminster College in New Wilmington, Pennsylvania from 1972 to 1990, compiling a record of 154–34–3.  Fusco was inducted into the College Football Hall of Fame as a coach in 2001.

Fusco had a lifetime association with Westminster  College. He was guard on the football team from 1957 to 1959, assistant coach from 1968 to 1971, head coach from 1972 to 1990, and athletic director  from 1985 to 1999. His other coaching duties were at Wilmington Area High School and Grove City Area Area High School, where he had a 55–14–3 record from 1960 to 1967. In 19 years at Westminster, his teams were ranked in the NAIA top 20 15 times, made in the NAIA Division II playoffs nine times, had a 27-game winning streak, and won four NAIA Division II Football National Championships, in 1976, 1977, 1988, and 1989.  His record as head coach at Westminster was 154–34–3, a winning percentage of .814.  His 1977 team won the Lambert Cup as the best small-college team in the East.

Fusco graduated from Westminster in 1960, added a master's degree in education in 1965 and a doctorate in education from the University of Pittsburgh in 1980.  In addition to the College Football Hall of Fame, Fusco is in the Italian American Sports Hall of Fame, Western Pennsylvania Hall of Fame, Lawrence County Hall of Fame, and NAIA Hall of Fame.

Head coaching record

College

References

External links
 

1938 births
Living people
Westminster Titans athletic directors
Westminster Titans football coaches
Westminster Titans football players
High school football coaches in Pennsylvania
College Football Hall of Fame inductees
University of Pittsburgh alumni
People from Wilkinsburg, Pennsylvania
Coaches of American football from Pennsylvania
Players of American football from Pennsylvania